Victoire Léodile Béra (18 August 1824 – 20 May 1900) was a French novelist, journalist and feminist. She took the name of André Léo, her two twin sons' names.

She was born in Lusignan, Vienne, at Town Hall square, in 1824. She stayed there until 1830, when her father moved to Champagné-Saint-Hilaire, where he was a judge. She left the region in 1851 for Lausanne in Switzerland, where she married Grégoire Champseix, who had been there since the spring of 1849 after fleeing repression due to his contribution to the 1848 revolution and later from the police of Napoleon III.

In 1866 a feminist group called the Société pour la Revendication du Droit des Femmes began to meet at the house of André Léo in Paris. Members included Paule Minck, Louise Michel, Eliska Vincent, Élie Reclus and his wife Noémie, Mme Jules Simon and Caroline de Barrau. Maria Deraismes also participated. Because of the broad range of opinions, the group decided to focus on the subject of improving girls' education.

André Léo fought with the French Republicans, later during the Commune de Paris, and in the International Workers Association. Travelling in Europe, she studied and worked at improving the feminine condition of her times. She died in Paris in 1900, after achieving much work: numerous novels, tales and essays, articles and political texts. Her writings, especially on social and educational issues, express ideas which still remain highly topical.

References

Sources

External links 

 Site of Association André Léo
 
 

1824 births
1900 deaths
People from Vienne
Pseudonymous women writers
19th-century French novelists
19th-century French women writers
19th-century women writers
French socialist feminists
19th-century pseudonymous writers